203 (Elswick) Battery Royal Artillery is a part of 101st (Northumbrian) Regiment Royal Artillery, an artillery regiment of the British Army.

History

Formed on 31 January 1900, the Elswick Battery, as it was then known, set off for South Africa to take part in the Second Boer War. The Battery was armed with 12 pounder guns manufactured by Armstrongs at Elswick. The guns had been paid for by Lady Meux, an eccentric brewery heiress.

When the Territorial Army as it was then known was reorganised in April 1967, three Batteries of the Royal Artillery in Blyth and Seaton Delaval were merged to form 203 Battery based in Blyth, part of 101st (Northumbrian) Regiment Royal Artillery. The Battery was equipped with the BL 5.5-inch Medium Gun in 1967, converting to the 105mm Light Gun in 1980. In April 1992, the Battery was again re-equipped, this time with FH-70 howitzers. In 1998, the Battery became one of only two reservist Batteries to be equipped with the M270 Multiple Launch Rocket System (MLRS).

References

Publications
 Litchfield, Norman E H, 1992. The Territorial Artillery 1908-1988, The Sherwood Press, Nottingham. 

Royal Artillery batteries